The 2013–14 Football League (known as the Sky Bet Football League for sponsorship reasons) was the 115th season of The Football League. It began on 3 August 2013 and concluded on 3 May 2014, with the promotion play-off finals at Wembley Stadium on 24–26 May 2014. The Football League is contested through three Divisions. The divisions are the Championship, League One and League Two. Leicester City, Burnley and Queens Park Rangers were promoted to the Premier League, while Bristol Rovers and Torquay United were relegated to the Conference Premier.

The 2013-14 season was the first in a five-year sponsorship agreement with betting company Sky Bet. As a result of the deal, the three Football League divisions were officially referred to as "The Sky Bet Championship", "Sky Bet League One" and "Sky Bet League Two".

Promotion and relegation

From Premier League
 Relegated to Championship
 Queens Park Rangers
 Reading
 Wigan Athletic

From Championship
 Promoted to Premier League
 Cardiff City
 Hull City
 Crystal Palace

 Relegated to League One
 Peterborough United
 Wolverhampton Wanderers
 Bristol City

From League One
 Promoted to Championship
 Doncaster Rovers
 Bournemouth
 Yeovil Town

 Relegated to League Two
 Scunthorpe United
 Bury
 Hartlepool United
 Portsmouth

From League Two
 Promoted to League One
 Gillingham
 Rotherham United
 Port Vale
 Bradford City

 Relegated to Conference Premier
 Barnet
 Aldershot Town

From Conference Premier
 Promoted to League Two
 Mansfield Town
 Newport County

Championship

Table

Play-offs

Results

League One

Table

Play-offs

Results

League Two

Table

Play-offs

Results

Managerial changes

References

External links
Football League website
BBC Sport

 
2013-14